Lander Aperribai Aranda (born 15 June 1982 in San Sebastián, Basque Country) is a Spanish former professional road bicycle racer, who rode professionally in 2007 and 2008 for the  team.

Major results

2004
 1st Stage 3 Vuelta al Goierri

External links 
Profile at Euskaltel-Euskadi official website 

Cyclists from the Basque Country (autonomous community)
Spanish male cyclists
1982 births
Living people
Sportspeople from San Sebastián